Joshua Reeve Randall (born January 27, 1972) is an American television actor. He is best known for his role as Dr. Mike Burton in the 2000–2004 NBC sitcom Ed and the recurring, later main role of Fire Captain Sean Beckett from 2021-2022 on Station 19. He had a recurring role on CBS' CSI: Crime Scene Investigation as Doug Wilson in 2012.

Early life and education
Randall was born January 28, 1972, in Pacific Grove, California, to Randy (teacher) and Sharon (writer). He has a brother (Nathan) and sister (Joanna).

Randall graduated from Monterey High School in Monterey, California. During his senior year, Randall was co-Editor-in-Chief of the school newspaper, The Galleon. He also played basketball.

His father Randy taught Chemistry and Physics at Monterey High. When Randy died in 1997 of colon cancer, the gym at Monterey High was named after him in memory shortly afterwards.

His mother, Sharon, is a syndicated columnist. Randall wrote the foreword to her book "Birdbaths and Paper Cranes."

Randall attended Monterey Peninsula College and San Francisco State University. He earned a BA in English with a minor in Film Study from SF State.

Personal life 
Randall married Claire Rankin on September 10, 2000, but divorced in 2013.

Filmography

Film

Television

References

External links
 

1972 births
American male television actors
Living people
People from Pacific Grove, California